Algibacter aestuarii is a bacterium from the genus of Algibacter.

References

Flavobacteria
Bacteria described in 2013